Divino afflante Spiritu ("[By] the divine inspiration of the Spirit") is a papal encyclical letter issued by Pope Pius XII on 30 September 1943 calling for new translations of the Bible into vernacular languages using the original languages as a source instead of the Latin Vulgate.

The Vulgate, made mostly by Jerome, had formed the textual basis for all Catholic vernacular translations of the Bible until then. Divino afflante Spiritu inaugurated the modern period of Roman Catholic biblical studies by encouraging the study of textual criticism (or lower criticism), pertaining to text of the Scriptures themselves and transmission thereof (for example, to determine correct readings) and permitted the use of the historical-critical method (or higher criticism), to be informed by theology, Sacred Tradition, and ecclesiastical history on the historical circumstances of the text, hypothesizing about matters such as authorship, dating, and similar concerns. The eminent Catholic biblical scholar Raymond E. Brown, described it as a "Magna Carta for biblical progress".

Description
The encyclical appeared on the feast of Jerome to commemorate the 50th anniversary of  Pope Leo XIII's 1893 encyclical Providentissimus Deus. With Providentissimus Deus, Pope Leo gave the first formal authorization for the use of critical methods in biblical scholarship. Pius XII noted that advances had been made in archaeology and historical research, which made it advisable to further define the study of the Bible.

Previously, Catholic translations of the Bible into modern languages were usually based on the Latin Vulgate, the text used in the Liturgy. They generally referred back to the source texts (in Biblical Hebrew, Biblical Aramaic and Biblical Greek) only to clarify the exact meaning of the Latin text.

In his encyclical, Pius stressed the importance of diligent study of the original languages and other cognate languages to arrive at a deeper and fuller knowledge of the meaning of the sacred texts:

See also

 Afflatus
 Dei verbum
 École Biblique

References

Bibliography

External links
 

1943 documents
1943 in Christianity
Biblical criticism
Encyclicals of Pope Pius XII
September 1943 events
Vulgate
Catholic bibles
Bible versions and translations